Sandbox: The Music of Mark Sandman (also known as Sandbox: Mark Sandman Original Music) is a posthumously-released 2-CD/1-DVD set by the former Morphine frontman Mark Sandman, released in November 2004 by Hi-N-Dry and distributed by KUFALA.

It contains 31 mostly previously unreleased songs recorded by Sandman and his various bands and side projects: Sandman, Treat Her Right, Hipnosonics, Pale Brothers, Supergroup, Candy Bar, Treat Her Orange, and Morphine. None of the tracks on the two CDs are credited to a particular band. The accompanying DVD contains videos, interviews, live performances, artwork, and photos.

Background
After Sandman's death in 1999, remaining Morphine members Dana Colley and Billy Conway, among others, opened up Sandman's home studio, Hi-N-Dry, for public use and started a record label of the same name. But when they tried to release Sandbox, Morphine's former label Rykodisc filed a lawsuit, claiming they owned several of the recordings. Hi-N-Dry eventually won the case in court, but with no money left to promote the album, it went nearly unnoticed when it was finally released in 2004.

According to Paste magazine, "Sandbox frequently extends beyond Morphine’s core sound" – blues and jazz elements combined with rock (2-string slide bass, saxophone and drums) – "highlighting territory Sandman explored in side projects." These projects included Sandman's longest-running side band, the horn-driven funk ensemble Hipnosonics (1986-1999); Supergroup with Chris Ballew (the Presidents of the United States of America); and the Jimmy Ryan (Blood Oranges) collaborations Treat Her Orange and the Pale Brothers.

Critical reception
                         
Trouser Press wrote that, with few exceptions, Sandbox "is nothing but memorable hooks and perceptive storytelling ... piano pops up in "Tomorrow," melodic allusions to the Kinks' "Celluloid Heroes" surface in "Patience," blow-your-woofer rock drives "Goddess" and "Doreen," and "Hombre" and "Hotel Room" will leave you sobbing in your cerveza. Each song brings something new to the table." Riverfront Times felt that Sandman's "cast-offs" and side projects were better than many other performers' best material, and that his "inviting, clear, honest singing, and the slightly rough-hewn joie de vivre in the instrumental performances" were the album's "unifying qualities." They concluded that Sandbox is not a "for-devotees-only collection" but for "anyone who values music encompassing both "roots" and restless creativity (Tom Waits, say)." Dallas Observer wrote, "The first disc, aside from a few kitschy songs, has a surprising number of strong Morphine outtakes. A studio version of live favorite "Goddess" is worth the price of admission, while the soft piano eulogy of "Devil's Boots," the country twinge of "Patience" and the spacey poetry of "Imaginary Song" reveal unseen shades of Morphine that will appease fans." They felt that most of the second disc "are for die-hards only."

Track listing

DVD

Personnel
Adapted from the album's liner notes.

Musicians
Mark Sandman – vocals, 2-string bass, 1-string bass, tritar, low guitar, acoustic guitar, electric guitar, piano, organ, synthesizer, banjo, manipulations
Billy Conway, Jerome Deupree, Billy Beard, Larry Dersch, Mickey Bones, Ron Ward, Jay Hilt, Jim Clements, Dominique Zar, Ken Winokur, Rick Barry, Jim Janota, Harvey Wirht – drums
Mike Rivard, Frank Swart, Chris Ballew, Rich Cortez, Rick McLaughlin – bass
Dana Colley, Russ Gershon, Tom Halter, Mike Moss, Charlie Kohlhase, Colin Fisher, Joel Yennior – horns
John Medeski – keyboards
Jimmy Ryan – mandolin
David Champagne – electric guitar
Joe Kessler, Jane Scarpantoni – strings
Laurie Sargent, Riley, Connie White, Toni Elka – backing vocals
Technical
Paul Q. Kolderie, Sean Slade, Tom Dube, Bob Holmes – producer 
Matthew Ellard, Jim Siegal, Brian Dunton, Lothar Siegler, Dicky Speer, Joe Harvard, Jim Scott, Mike Denneen – engineer
Toby Mountain – mastering
John Wiswell – additional mastering
Billy Conway, Dana Colley, Jerome Deupree, Laurie Sargent, Billy Beard, Jeff Sias, Brian Papciak – compilation
Andrew D. Mazzone – executive producer
Jabe Beyer, Dana Colley – layout, design

References

2004 debut albums
Albums published posthumously